Golfo Nuevo (Spanish for "New Gulf") is a body of water formed by the Península Valdés and Punta Ninfas in the province of Chubut in the Argentine Patagonia. Puerto Madryn is its major seaport.

Wildlife
From May to December, the southern right whales migrate to Golfo Nuevo to breed, drawing numerous tourists through Madryn.

History
The bight was named Bahía Sin Fondo ("Bottomless Bay";  or ) by Ferdinand Magellan when he visited it in 1520. In the 18th century, Welsh colonists renamed it Bahía Nueva, whence its current name. It was also sometimes known as Bahía de San Matías ("Saint Matthew's Bay"). Golfo Nuevo was also the scene of a series of mysterious submarine contacts in 1958 and 1960.

References

External links 
 Golfo Nuevo (Archived 2009-10-31) - MSN Encarta

Landforms of Chubut Province
Nuevo
Landforms of Argentina
Bays of Argentina